Ingrid Persdotter (died 28 March 1524) was a fictitious Swedish nun at the convent of Saint Birgitta in Vadstena. She is famous for having written passionate love letters to a knight named Axel Nilsson in 1498.

Ingrid was the daughter of the mayor of the city of Vadstena, Petri (Per) Jönsson. She entered the Vadstena Abbey on 25 October 1495. Apparently, she was placed in the convent because of her love for a member of the nobility, Axel Nilsson (Roos), who was not allowed to marry her because of her social position. Her love letter to him from the convent in 1498 is regarded as one of the most notable stylistic examples from a Swedish pre-reformation nun. It is also one of the eldest letters preserved from a Swedish female.

See also
 Liten Agda and Olof Tyste

References

People from Vadstena Municipality
15th-century Swedish nuns
Bridgettine nuns
1524 deaths
16th-century Swedish nuns
15th-century Swedish women writers
Swedish letter writers